William Gordon Ernst,  (October 18, 1897 – July 12, 1939) was a Canadian politician.

Born in Mahone Bay, Nova Scotia, he first ran for the House of Commons of Canada in the 1925 federal election in the Nova Scotia riding of Queens—Lunenburg. A Conservative, he was defeated but he was elected in the 1926 federal election. He was re-elected in 1930 and defeated in 1935. In 1935, he was the Minister of Fisheries.

He served as a captain in the 85th Canadian Infantry Battalion during World War I and was awarded the Military Cross and Bar.

References

1897 births
1939 deaths
Canadian Expeditionary Force officers
Conservative Party of Canada (1867–1942) MPs
Members of the House of Commons of Canada from Nova Scotia
Members of the King's Privy Council for Canada
People from Lunenburg County, Nova Scotia
Canadian recipients of the Military Cross